The European Freestyle Skating Championships is the main freestyle skating  championships in Europe, organized by European Confederation of Roller Skating.

Summary of Championships

External links
CERS Official Website
2021 European Championships Official website

Roller skating competitions
European championships